Oenopota violacea is a species of sea snail, a marine gastropod mollusk in the family Mangeliidae.

Description
It is extremely difficult to characterise this species, because both its form and sculpture are more variable than in any other of the whole genus. Sometimes the form is oval, with the spire about the same length as the aperture, and sometimes it is fusiform, witli a long, strongly acuminate spire. The whorls are sometimes angulated and sometimes cylindrically rounded. The sculpture is, often, by far the most prominent in the axial direction, and often, it is so transversally. The typical shell has, thus, very prominent spiral ribs devoid of other sculpture than lines of growth, whilst the varieties violacea and cylindracea, frequently, have quite prominent axial ribs, and these are invariably – even if they only occur as lines of growth – curved. The most characteristic feature is the, not very long, cauda, and the deep wide siphonal canal. The apex gives no assistance as a specific feature, because it varies according to the sculptural character of the shell.

The shell of the variety gemminolineata is fusiform. The spire is strongly acuminate, and longer than the aperture. The axial sculpture consists of, only faint lines of growth, whilst the spiral sculpture consists of lines occurring in pairs. In the penultimate whorl there are 4 pairs of such lines.

Distribution
This species occurs in Northeast Atlantic Ocean and off the British Isles at depths between 80 m and 505 m

References

 Gofas, S.; Le Renard, J.; Bouchet, P. (2001). Mollusca, in: Costello, M.J. et al. (Ed.) (2001). European register of marine species: a check-list of the marine species in Europe and a bibliography of guides to their identification. Collection Patrimoines Naturels, 50: pp. 180–213
 Sysoev A.V. (2014). Deep-sea fauna of European seas: An annotated species check-list of benthic invertebrates living deeper than 2000 m in the seas bordering Europe. Gastropoda. Invertebrate Zoology. Vol.11. No.1: 134–155

External links
 Friele H., 1877: Preliminary report on the Mollusca from the Norwegian North Atlantic Expedition in 1876; Nyt Magazin for Naturvidenskaberne 23: 1–10, 1 pl. 
 
 

violacea
Gastropods described in 1842